Trogolegnum is a genus of moths in the  family Sphingidae, containing only one species, Trogolegnum pseudambulyx, which is known from Mexico.

Description
The forewing is strongly excavate below the apex especially in males. The proboscis is very short and weak. The forewing colour and pattern are similar to Adhemarius donysa but the subbasal band extends to the costal edge.

References

Ambulycini
Monotypic moth genera
Taxa named by Walter Rothschild
Taxa named by Karl Jordan
Moths of Central America